Bhait is a village in Gurdaspur district of Punjab State, India, located  from Gurdaspur. The village is administrated by a Sarpanch, an elected representative of the village as per the Constitution of India and the Panchayati raj system.

Demography 
According to the report published by Census India in 2011, Bhait has 207 houses and a population of 988 residents, 508 males and 480 females. Its literacy rate is 78.54%, higher than the state average of 75.84%. The population of children under the age of 6 years is 98, forming 9.92% of its population, and the child sex ratio is approximately 633, lower than the state average of 846.

Population data

Air travel connectivity 
The closest airport to the village is Sri Guru Ram Dass Jee International Airport.

Villages in Gurdaspur

External links
  Villages in Gurdaspur 
 -Tehsil-In-Batala-District.html Gurdaspur Villages List

References

Villages in Kapurthala district